Abacomorphus is a genus of beetles in the family Carabidae, containing the following species:

 Abacomorphus asperulus Fauvel, 1882
 Abacomorphus caledonicus (Montrouzier, 1860)

References

Pterostichinae